The 2-Piece (二枚落ち nimai-ochi) handicap in shogi has both of White's major pieces (the rook and the bishop) removed. Thus, White is left with pawns, golds, silvers, knights, and lances.

Black has the usual setup of twenty pieces.

The 2-Piece handicap is an official handicap of the Japan Shogi Association.

Openings

☖5...K-52

Two-Pawn Sacrifice Push

Two-Pawn Sacrifice Push (二歩突っ切り ni fu tsukkiri).

9. R-38. Black plays Sleeve Rook.

18. S-68. Black's Crab castle is complete.

Silver Tandem

Silver Tandem (銀多伝 gin taden).

☖5...P-55

☖10...K-52

☖10...G-52

See also

 4-Piece handicap
 Handicap (shogi)
 Shogi opening

Bibliography

  · Rook & Lance, 2-Piece, 4-Piece, and 6-Piece  handicap games from 1981

External links

 Handicap Series by Larry Kaufman:
 Two piece handicap
 Two piece handicap: Variation 1
 Two piece handicap: Variation 2
 Two piece handicap: Variation 3
 Two piece handicap: Variation 4
 Two piece handicap: Variation 5
 HIDETCHI's YouTube channel: How To Play Shogi (将棋): Lesson 26: Handicapped Games (2/2)

Shogi openings
Handicap shogi openings